Isaías "Iyo" S. Pimentel (16 February 1933 – 26 June 2017) was a Venezuelan international tennis player.

Playing career
Born on the Dutch island of Curaçao in 1933, Pimentel was three times Curaçaoan champion. 

He competed in the Davis Cup, representing Venezuela, a number of times, from 1957 to 1966.

References

External links
 
 
 

1933 births
2017 deaths
Curaçao emigrants to Venezuela
Venezuelan male tennis players
20th-century Venezuelan people